Sidique Mansaray (born July 23, 1980 in Koidu Town, Sierra Leone) is a Sierra Leonean footballer, who currently plays as a striker for the East End Lions in Sierra Leone National Premier League. He is also a regular member of the Leone Stars, Sierra Leone national football team. in 2001, Mansaray scored the only goal as Sierra Leone defeated Nigeria 1-0 in a 2002 FIFA World Cup qualifying match in Freetown

Profile
Sidique Mansaray was born and raised in Sierra Leone's fourth largest city of Koidu Town, Kono District, to prominent Mandingo parents. He attended the Koidu Secondary School in Koidu Town.  He started his professional football career with his hometown club, the Diamond Stars, in the Sierra Leone National Premier League in 1996 at a very young age and made his senior international debut for Sierra Leone in 1997.

External links

1980 births
Sierra Leonean footballers
Living people
People from Koidu
Sierra Leone international footballers
Association football forwards